John Lauris Blake (March 25, 1831, in Boston, Massachusetts – October 10, 1899, in West Orange, New Jersey) was an American Republican Party politician who represented New Jersey's 6th congressional district in the United States House of Representatives from 1879 to 1881.

Early life and education
Blake was born in Boston, Massachusetts, on March 25, 1831. He received a classical education and moved to Orange, in 1846. He studied law, was admitted to the bar in 1852 and commenced practice in Orange.

He was a member of the New Jersey General Assembly in 1857 and was a delegate to the 1876 Republican National Convention.

Congress
Blake was elected as a Republican to the Forty-sixth Congress, serving in office from March 4, 1879, to March 3, 1881, but declined to be a candidate for renomination in 1880.

After leaving Congress, he resumed his law practice in Orange, and became president of the Citizens' Gas Light Co. of Newark, in 1893.

Death
He died in West Orange, on October 10, 1899, and was interred in Rosedale Cemetery in Orange.

External links

John Lauris Blake at The Political Graveyard

1831 births
1899 deaths
Republican Party members of the New Jersey General Assembly
Politicians from Boston
Politicians from Essex County, New Jersey
People from West Orange, New Jersey
People from Orange, New Jersey
Republican Party members of the United States House of Representatives from New Jersey
Burials at Rosedale Cemetery (Orange, New Jersey)
19th-century American politicians